Jamie Peter Drew (born 7 December 1973) is an Australian former racing cyclist. He won the Australian national road race title in 2000. He won the Melbourne to Warrnambool Classic in 1999 and 2002.

Major results

1994
 1st Stage 4 Commonwealth Bank Classic
1996
 1st Stage 5 Tour of Tasmania
1997
 1st Grafton to Inverell Classic
1998
 1st Giro delle Due Province
1999
 1st Melbourne to Warrnambool Classic
 1st Grafton to Inverell Classic
 1st Melbourne to Sorrento Classic (with Stuart O'Grady)
 3rd Road race, National Road Championships
 6th Overall Herald Sun Tour
2000
 1st  Road race, National Road Championships
 1st Overall Mi-Août en Bretagne
 1st Overall Sea Otter Classic
1st Stage 3
 1st Stage 2 Tour de Langkawi
 1st Stage 15 (ITT) Herald Sun Tour
2001
 2nd Overall Valley of the Sun Stage Race
2002
 1st Melbourne to Warrnambool Classic
2003
 2nd Melbourne to Warrnambool Classic
 9th Overall Herald Sun Tour
1st Stage 4

References

External links

1973 births
Living people
Australian male cyclists
People from Blackburn